Alejandro Samuel Márquez Pérez  (born 31 October 1991) is a Chilean professional footballer that currently plays as a defensive midfielder for Deportes Temuco.

Club career

On 12 September 2010, Márquez made his Unión Temuco debut against Lota Schwager. He with the pass of time was a frequently in Temuco's squad, consecrating him at the team. On 20 November 2011 he officially debuted with Universidad de Chile in a match against Universidad Católica for the 2011 Torneo Clausura. For the 2012 season he returned to Unión Temuco, after being on loan 6 months at Universidad de Chile.

O'Higgins

On 11 July 2015, he joined in O'Higgins in a loan for 1 year, starting for the 2015–16 season.

International career

In January 2011, it was revelated that the coach César Vaccia selected Márquez for the South American Championship squad that was going to travel to Peru. He debuted against host team Peru and played 90 minutes. On 24 January, he scored his first international goal against Argentina in a 3–1 defeat. In a decisive game against Venezuela, he scored his second goal for Chile in the last match of the group stage, now in a 3–1 victory, thus establishing as the goalscorer of his team in the group stage.

Honours

Club
Universidad de Chile
Primera División de Chile (1): 2011 Clausura
Copa Sudamericana (1): 2011

References

External links
Alejandro Márquez at Football Lineups

1991 births
Living people
People from Loncoche
Chilean footballers
Chilean expatriate footballers
Chile under-20 international footballers
South American Youth Championship players
Unión Temuco footballers
Universidad de Chile footballers
Deportes Temuco footballers
Club Deportivo Palestino footballers
O'Higgins F.C. footballers
Paraná Clube players
Primera B de Chile players
Chilean Primera División players
Campeonato Brasileiro Série B players
Chilean expatriate sportspeople in Brazil
Expatriate footballers in Brazil
Association football midfielders